Świniary  is a village in the administrative district of Gmina Wąsosz, within Góra County, Lower Silesian Voivodeship, in south-western Poland.

History
Świniary dates back to the medieval Piast-ruled Kingdom of Poland. In the medieval Liber fundationis episcopatus Vratislaviensis it was mentioned under the Latinized name Swinari. The name of the village is of Polish origin and comes from the word świnia, which means "pig". Between 1871 and 1945 it was part of Germany. During World War II, the Germans established a forced labour camp for Belgians, Poles, Russians and Czechs in the village.

References

Villages in Góra County